Zakraj is a small settlement northeast of Nova Vas in the Municipality of Bloke in the Inner Carniola region of Slovenia.

References

External links

Zakraj on Geopedia

Populated places in the Municipality of Bloke